Alangulam is a state legislative assembly constituency in Tenkasi district in the Indian state of Tamil Nadu. It includes the city, Alangulam Tenkasi district. It is a part of the Tirunelveli Lok Sabha constituency.
Most successful candidate: DMK & ADMK (5 times). It is one of the 234 State Legislative Assembly Constituencies in Tamil Nadu, in India.

Madras State

Tamil Nadu

Election results

2021

2016

2011

2006

2001

1996

1991

1989

1984

1980

1977

1971

1967

1962

1957

1952

References 

 

Assembly constituencies of Tamil Nadu
Tirunelveli district